"I'm Leaving It Up to You" is a song written by and originally performed by Don Harris and Dewey Terry in 1957. It was later popularized in 1963 by the American duo Dale and Grace, who took it to #1 on the Billboard Hot 100 chart. In 1974, Donny and Marie Osmond reached the top five on the US Hot 100 chart and peaked at #1 on the Billboard Hot Adult Contemporary chart with their cover.

Dale and Grace version
"I'm Leaving It Up to You" first became popular when recorded by the duo Dale and Grace in 1963. Their version became a #1 hit in the United States on the Billboard Hot 100 for two weeks in late 1963, replacing "Deep Purple" by Nino Tempo & April Stevens but ending up one position lower than that record on the 1963 end-of-the-year chart.  This situation was the first time that a duet immediately succeeded another duet at the top spot.

The single also spent two weeks atop the easy listening chart. It was the #1 song on the Billboard Hot 100 chart when President John F. Kennedy was assassinated in Dallas, Texas.  Dale and Grace were in Dallas on the day of the murder.  The duo was scheduled to perform that night as part of Dick Clark's Caravan of Stars (with Bobby Rydell, Jimmy Clanton, and Brian Hyland) and had waved to the president's motorcade from a vantage point near their hotel, moments before the assassination.  Needless to say, Dick Clark's Caravan of Stars was cancelled that night, as was the next night in Oklahoma.

Chart performance

Weekly charts

Year-end charts

Donny and Marie Osmond version

In 1974, "I'm Leaving It Up to You" (released and noted as "I'm Leaving It (All) Up to You") again became a chart-topping hit in the US when brother and sister duo Donny and Marie Osmond covered it in September, it reached #4 on the Hot 100 and #1 on the easy listening chart.  It also reached #2 in the UK. Their version became a gold record, as did the album from which the title track was taken.

Chart performance

Weekly charts

Year-end charts

Certifications

Other versions
A Spanish version , written by Leslie Royal and Héctor Romero of Mexican group Los Jets de Nogales, was recorded by them in 1963 as "Decídelo tú", and by Mexican group Yndio in 1972, under the name "Sin tu amor", with the song's new name used as title for Yndio's album.

See also
List of Hot 100 number-one singles of 1963 (U.S.)
List of number-one adult contemporary singles of 1963 (U.S.)
List of number-one adult contemporary singles of 1974 (U.S.)

References

1957 songs
1963 singles
1974 singles
Donny Osmond songs
Marie Osmond songs
Billboard Hot 100 number-one singles
Cashbox number-one singles